Charles Barrimore Notley (23 December 1879 – 1968) better known as Barry Notley was a British fencer. He competed at four Olympic Games. In 1925 and 1927, he won the épée title at the British Fencing Championships.

References

1879 births
1968 deaths
British male fencers
Olympic fencers of Great Britain
Fencers at the 1908 Summer Olympics
Fencers at the 1920 Summer Olympics
Fencers at the 1924 Summer Olympics
Fencers at the 1928 Summer Olympics
People from Hackney Central
Sportspeople from London